Ruby Rana (born 1972) is a Nepalese model, actress and beauty pageant title holder. She was crowned as the first ever Miss Nepal in 1994. She competed for the Miss Nepal title after winning the title of Miss Birgunj in 1994. She has also acted in couple of Nepalese films and was the judge of the first season of Mega Model, a modeling-based reality show.

Biography 
She was born on 22 September 1972 in Kathmandu, Nepal.

She was one of the judge of the first season of Mega Model, a Nepalese spin-off of America's Next Top Model.

She acted in the 2014 Nepalese action movie—Hasiya, alongside Rajesh Hamal, Anoop Bikram Shahi and Hema Shrestha. She also played a supporting role in 2018 romantic movie—Intu Mintu Londonma.

Filmography

Films

Television

Personal life 
She married Prajaya Bikram Shah, an ex-army officer, in 1996.

See also
 List of Nepalese models

References

1972 births
Living people
Miss Nepal winners
Nepalese female models
Nepalese beauty pageant winners
21st-century Nepalese actresses
Khas people
People from Kathmandu